Artak Hovhannisyan (born 1 October 1993) is an Armenian Freestyle wrestler. He won the 2009 Cadet European Championship. Hovhannisyan competed at the 2010 Summer Youth Olympics in Singapore and won the bronze medal in the boys' freestyle 46 kg event, defeating Andry Davila of Venezuela in the bronze medal match.

References

1993 births
Living people
Armenian male sport wrestlers
Wrestlers at the 2010 Summer Youth Olympics
21st-century Armenian people